Olympic Club Mbongo Sport is a football club in Mbuji-Mayi, Democratic Republic of Congo.  In the 2006/2007 season they played in the Linafoot, the top level of professional football in DR Congo.

Honours
Coupe du Congo
 Runners-up (1): 1995

Performance in CAF competitions
CAF Cup: 1 appearance
1992 – Quarter-Final

Football clubs in the Democratic Republic of the Congo
Mbuji-Mayi